|}
Barry Francis Coulter  (born 27 December 1948) is a former Australian politician. He was a Country Liberal Party member of the Northern Territory Legislative Assembly from 1983 to 1999, representing the electorates of Berrimah, Palmerston and Blain. He was Deputy Chief Minister from 1986 to 1995 under Stephen Hatton and Marshall Perron. He was expected to succeed Perron but was defeated by Shane Stone.

References

1948 births
Living people
Country Liberal Party members of the Northern Territory Legislative Assembly
Deputy Chief Ministers of the Northern Territory
Members of the Northern Territory Legislative Assembly
Treasurers of the Northern Territory
Officers of the Order of Australia